The Canton of Ailly-sur-Noye is a canton situated in the department of the Somme and in the Hauts-de-France region of northern France.

Geography 
The canton is organized around the commune of Ailly-sur-Noye.

Composition
At the French canton reorganisation which came into effect in March 2015, the canton was expanded from 22 to 54 communes (3 of which were merged into the new commune Ô-de-Selle):

Ailly-sur-Noye
Aubvillers
Bacouel-sur-Selle
Belleuse
Bosquel
Brassy
Chaussoy-Epagny
Chirmont
Contre
Conty
Cottenchy
Coullemelle
Courcelles-sous-Thoix
Dommartin
Esclainvillers
Essertaux
Estrées-sur-Noye
La Faloise
Flers-sur-Noye
Fleury
Folleville
Fossemanant
Fouencamps
Fransures
Frémontiers
Grattepanche
Grivesnes
Guyencourt-sur-Noye
Hallivillers
Jumel
Lawarde-Mauger-l'Hortoy
Louvrechy
Mailly-Raineval
Monsures
Namps-Maisnil
Nampty
Ô-de-Selle
Oresmaux
Plachy-Buyon
Prouzel
Quiry-le-Sec
Remiencourt
Rogy
Rouvrel
Saint-Sauflieu
Sauvillers-Mongival
Sentelie
Sourdon
Thézy-Glimont
Thoix
Thory 
Velennes

Population

See also
 Arrondissements of the Somme department
 Cantons of the Somme department
 Communes of the Somme department

References

Ailly-sur-Noye